The 2009 IIHF Challenge Cup of Asia took place in Abu Dhabi, United Arab Emirates from 15 March to 20 March. It was the second annual event, and was run by the International Ice Hockey Federation (IIHF). United Arab Emirates won the championship, winning all five of its games and defeating Thailand in the final 5–3.

Group stage
Eight participating teams were placed in the following two groups. After playing a round-robin, the teams move to the preliminary round to decide the final ranking.

Group A

All times local.

Group B

All times local.

Playoff round

5th–8th playoffs

Bracket

Semi-finals

Seventh place

Fifth place

Medal playoffs

Bracket

Semi-finals

Bronze medal game

Gold medal game

Final rankings

References

External links
Internal Ice Hockey Federation

Challenge Cup Of Asia, 2009
Iihf Challenge Cup Of Asia, 2009
2009
2009